Lemma Megersa (born 26 July 1970) is an Ethiopian politician who served as the Minister of Defense 2019 to 2020. He was also the president of the Oromia Region and deputy chairman of the ruling party in the region, the Oromo Democratic Party. Since the formation of the Prosperity Party, Lemma has been independent.

Background 
Lemma Megersa was born in the Welega Province. He completed his secondary education at General Tadesse Biru Secondary School. He received a bachelor's degree from Addis Ababa University in Political Science and International Relations, and later graduated with a master's degree in International Relations from the same university.

Lemma served as speaker of Caffee, the Oromia regional parliament, before becoming regional president in October 2016..

Reforms 
One of the first reforms Lemma tried to undertake was to prevent the interference of the federal police in the state affairs of Oromia region. He called for respect of the constitution and let the region exercise its constitutional power. In this regard, Lemma managed to limit and prevent the interference of the military in regional demonstrations, and regulating investments within Oromia Regional State.

Lemma also took measures on investment projects that were operating in violation of rules or not benefiting the region. The regional government terminated the operating license of such businesses. Besides, a number of illegal mining companies were shut down.

His efforts to introduce reform and to unite the country led to The Economist describing him as "the country’s most popular politician".

His disagreements with the government made him not want to join in the formation of the Prosperity Party, led by the Prime Minister. In 2020, he was replaced from his post as defense minister after openly criticizing the government's political reforms.

As of December 6, 2020 Lemma has been placed under house arrest.

Personal life
Lemma is a board member of the Assemblies of God in Ethiopia.

References

1970 births
Living people
Defence ministers of Ethiopia
Presidents of Oromia Region
People from Oromia Region
Ethiopian People's Revolutionary Democratic Front politicians
Oromo Democratic Party politicians
Addis Ababa University alumni
Ethiopian Pentecostals
Assemblies of God people
21st-century Ethiopian politicians